Louis Frederick John Spencer, Viscount Althorp (born 14 March 1994), is a British aristocrat and eldest son and heir of Charles Spencer, 9th Earl Spencer. He is the nephew of Diana, Princess of Wales, the first wife of King Charles III.

Early life
He was born at St Mary's Hospital, London in Westminster, London, the fourth child and eldest son of Charles Spencer, 9th Earl Spencer, and his first wife, Victoria Lockwood. A nephew of Diana, Princess of Wales, and a first cousin of the Prince of Wales and Prince Harry, Duke of Sussex, he is the heir apparent to the Spencer earldom.

A year after he was born, his family moved to Cape Town in South Africa, where he grew up. Lord Althorp was a pupil at Diocesan College in Cape Town, and later enrolled at the University of Edinburgh. He graduated from Arts Educational Schools in London, on 6 September 2022, as the valedictorian.

Viscount Althorp
English primogeniture law dictates that Lord Althorp, not his elder sister, Lady Kitty Spencer, who is her father's firstborn child, will inherit the Spencer title. Property is divisible separately, but most peers choose to keep property and title combined.

References

1994 births
Living people
British courtesy viscounts
Louis
Alumni of the University of Edinburgh
Alumni of Diocesan College, Cape Town